Betsy Lake is a lake located in Luce County in the U.S. state of Michigan.

See also
List of lakes in Michigan

References

Bodies of water of Luce County, Michigan
Lakes of Michigan